André Toussaint was a Haitian singer and guitarist who emigrated to Nassau, Bahamas in 1953 and performed there until his death in 1981. He sang and recorded in several languages and in a variety of styles, most notably calypso.

Discography

Albums
Andre Toussaint Sings at Blackbeard's Tavern (1954), Art Records
Andre Toussaint and "the Caribbeans" (1956), Bahama
Live at La Fin (1959), Art Records
The Golden Voice of Haiti: André Toussaint Goes International, Elite
Treasured Moments with Andre Toussaint 
Bahamian Ballads (2002), Naxos

Multi-artist compilations
Nassau's Junkanoo Festival (1956), Bahama
Calypso: Vintage Songs from the Caribbean (2002), Putumayo
Mirror to the Soul: Music, Culture and Identity in the Caribbean, 1920–72 (2013), Soul Jazz. Includes "Nassau Cha Cha".

References

External links
 PopMatters review of Bahamian Ballads compilation
 Allmusic biography

20th-century Haitian male singers
1981 deaths
Calypsonians
Bahamian singers
Year of birth missing
People from Nassau, Bahamas
Haitian emigrants to the Bahamas